This is a list of alternate history fiction, sorted primarily by type and then chronologically.

Standalone novels

Novel series

Anthologies

Short stories and novellas

Role-playing/board games

Comics

Films

TV shows

Plays

Video games

See also
 American Civil War alternate histories
 Axis victory in World War II
 List of fictional British monarchs
 List of fictional timelines
 List of fictional universes
 List of science fiction novels
 List of steampunk works
 Uchronia: The Alternate History List

References

External links
Uchronia lists over 2000 works of alternate history.
Library Thing: Alternate History lists books most often tabbed as alternate history.

alternate history